Terrestrial Energy is a Canadian nuclear technology company working on Generation IV nuclear technology. It expects to produce cost-competitive, high-temperature thermal energy with zero emissions.  
The company is developing a 190 MWe Integral Molten Salt Reactor design and is conducting its Pre-Licensing Vendor Design Review  with the Canadian Nuclear Safety Commission.

This is one example of a small modular reactor (SMR) characteristic of Generation IV nuclear reactor designs. 

Terrestrial Energy claims two principal advantages over legacy nuclear power plants. First, construction is meant to take 4 years, versus 8-12 for legacy designs. Second, the T-E IMSR plant can be used to generate either electricity or industrial steam.

Relative to other Generation IV designs, T-E’s IMSR uses no unproven engineering concepts, instead leveraging proven technologies in a unique way. This is meant to reduce licensing and timeline risks that have slowed the adoption of other approaches.

History 
Alberta, Ontario, New Brunswick and Saskatchewan began jointly working to advance SMR  in April 2021. https://www.nextbigfuture.com/2022/08/terrestrial-energy-and-alberta-commercializing-smr-reactor.html

Design 
The plant is designed for industrial cogeneration as well as power generation. 

The reactor uses molten salt as both fuel and coolant.

References

External links
 Terrestrial Energy | Leading the Way to a Bright Energy Future | 4th Generation Nuclear Power Official website

Nuclear technology companies of Canada